The 1963 Philadelphia Eagles season was the franchise's 31st season in the National Football League.

Offseason 
The 1963 NFL Draft and the 1963 AFL Draft

Regular season

Schedule 

Note: Intra-conference opponents are in bold text.

Standings

Awards and honors

References 

 Eagles on Pro Football Reference
 Eagles on jt-sw.com

Philadelphia Eagles seasons
Philadelphia Eagles
Philadel